The Panasonic Lumix DMC-LX10 (also DMC-LX15 in some markets) is a 20 MP 1" sensor compact camera in the Lumix range, announced by Panasonic on September 19, 2016. LX10 features an F1.4–2.8 equivalent Leica-branded zoom lens, 3" 1040k dot LCD, built-in flash, built-in wireless, and it can record 4K (Ultra HD) video at 30p or Full HD at 60p. The LX10 is more compact than the Panasonic LX100 or GX8 series by not having an electronic viewfinder, interchangeable lenses, or hot shoe. The camera is typically compared to the Sony RX100 series. 

Video Capture Quality
The DMC-LX10 (PAL) version provides the following video capture quality H.264 - 3840 x 2160 p - 30p - 100MbpsH.264 - 3840 x 2160 p - 25p - 100MbpsH.264 - 3840 x 2160 p - 24p - 100MbpsH.264 - 1920 x 1080 p - 60p - 28MbpsH.264 - 1920 x 1080 p - 50p - 28MbpsH.264 - 1920 x 1080 p - 30p - 20MbpsH.264 - 1920 x 1080 p - 25p - 20MbpsH.264 - 1280 x 720 p - 30p - 28MbpsH.264 - 1280 x 720 p - 25p - 28MbpsAVCHD - 1920 x 1080 p - 50p - 28MbpsAVCHD - 1920 x 1080 i - 50i (sensor output 25p) - 17MbpsAVCHD - 1920 x 1080 p - 24p - 24Mbps(These video capture qualities are different from the LX15 NTSC version)The LX10 (PAL version) has Slow Motion video capability in FHD (1080p) captured at 100 fps MP4 providing a 25 fps output.

References

External links
http://shop.panasonic.com/cameras-and-camcorders/cameras/lumix-point-and-shoot-cameras/DMC-LX10K.html#start=1&cgid=cameras

LX10